Saqr ( 'falcon') or Sakr is an Arabic given name and surname. Notable people with the name include:

Given name

Saqr
Saqr Geroushi, Chief of Staff of the Libyan Air Force
Saqr Ghobash, Emirati politician
Saqr bin Mohammad Al Qasimi (c. 1920–2010), Emîr, ruler of Ras Al Khaimah
Saqr bin Muhammed bin Saqr Al-Qasimi (died 2007), a member of the royal Al-Qasimi family, was deputy ruler of Sharjah till 1994
Saqr bin Sultan Al Qasimi (1924–1993), Emir, ruler of Sharjah (1951 to 1965)
Saqr bin Zayed Al Nahyan (1887–1928), third ruler of Abu Dhabi

as bin Saqr
Ahmed bin Saqr al-Qassimi (fl. 2009), Chairman of the Ras Al Khaimah Department of Customs and Seaports
Khalid bin Saqr Al Qasimi (fl. 1958–2003), former Crown Prince and deputy ruler of Ras al-Khaimah
Sultan bin Saqr Al Qasimi (18th century–1866), ruler of the emirates of Sharjah and Ras Al Khaimah (1803–1840, 1840–1866)

as bint Saqr
Asmaa bint Saqr Al Qasimi (2008–2013), UAE female poet

Surname

Sakr
Antoine Sakr, Lebanese footballer
Abd El-Karim Sakr (1918–1994), Egyptian football player
Habib Abou Sakr, Lebanese Maronite academic
Joseph Sakr (1939-1997), Lebanese folkloric and pop singer and stage actor
Karol Sakr (born 1969), Lebanese singer
Laila Shereen Sakr (born 1971), known by her moniker VJ Um Amel, Egyptian–American digital media theorist and artist
Naomi Sakr, British professor, author and public speaker
Okab Sakr (born 1975), Lebanese journalist and politician
Pascale Sakr (born 1964), Lebanese singer
Yasser Sakr (born 1977), amateur Egyptian Greco-Roman wrestler

Saqr
Ahmed Al Saqr (born 1970), Lebanese football player 
Etienne Saqr (born 1937) also known by his nom de guerre "Abu Arz", far-right, Lebanese nationalist leader 
Ihab Saqr, believed to have coordinated the 1995 bombing of the Egyptian embassy in Islamabad
Mohamed Saqr (born 1981), Qatari football player
Muhammad Jamal Saqr (born 1966), Egyptian writer, academic and poet

See also
Sakhr (disambiguation)
 Sakir

Arabic given names
Arabic-language surnames